OFG Bancorp, founded in 1964, more commonly known as OFG or Oriental Bank, is a financial holding company located in San Juan, Puerto Rico. OFG offers a wide range of retail and commercial banking, lending and wealth management products, services and technology, primarily in Puerto Rico through its principal subsidiaries: Oriental Bank, Oriental Financial Services Corp., and Oriental Insurance, Inc. Its headquarters are located at the Oriental Center, 15th Floor, 254 Muñoz Rivera Avenue, San Juan, PR 00918. OFG Bancorp, one of Puerto Rico's top three banks, has $9.3 billion in assets (2019), and approximately 2,400 employees (2019).

In 2010, Oriental acquired failed competitor Eurobank. In late 2012, Oriental announced the acquisition of Spain's Banco Bilbao Vizcaya Argentaria's Puerto Rican unit for $500 million in cash.

The company changed its name to OFG Bancorp from Oriental Financial Group in 2013.

In June 2019 it was announced that OFG Bancorp would acquire all branches of Scotiabank within Puerto Rico and The United States Virgin Islands territories as part of a $550M cash deal.

Subsidiaries
 Oriental Bank
 Oriental Financial Services Corp.
 Oriental Insurance, Inc.
 Oriental Pension Consultants, Inc. (OPC).
 Oriental Mortgage
 Oriental Auto

References

External links
 Official Site (Puerto Rico) 
 Official Site (Puerto Rico) 
 Financial highlights

Banks of Puerto Rico
Companies based in San Juan, Puerto Rico
Companies listed on the New York Stock Exchange
1964 establishments in Puerto Rico